Village Love or The Village Lovers (French - L'Amour au village) is an 1882 painting by Jules Bastien-Lepage. It was acquired in 1885 by Sergei Tretyakov at the posthumous sale of the artist's works at Georges Petit's gallery. The Musée du Luxembourg had initially been interested in the work, but instead chose Haymaking (later transferred to the Louvre then to the Musée d'Orsay). Village Love later entered the State Museum of New Western Art and in 1948 the Pushkin Museum, where it still hangs.

References

1882 paintings
Paintings in the collection of the Pushkin Museum
Paintings by Jules Bastien-Lepage